Javier Ajenjo (born 12 January 2001) is a professional footballer who plays as a midfielder for Segunda Federación side Recreativo de Huelva, on loan from Śląsk Wrocław. Born in Spain to a Spanish father and a Polish mother, he has represented Poland at youth international level.

Career statistics

Club

Notes

References

External links

2001 births
Living people
Footballers from Madrid
Spanish people of Polish descent
Citizens of Poland through descent
Polish people of Spanish descent
Spanish footballers
Polish footballers
Association football midfielders
Atlético Madrid footballers
Piast Gliwice players
Śląsk Wrocław players
Recreativo de Huelva players
Ekstraklasa players
II liga players
Poland youth international footballers